Chuck Martin may refer to:

 Chuck Martin (American football) (born 1968), American football coach
 Chuck Martin (basketball) (born 1969), American college basketball coach
 Chuck Martin (politician), American politician
 Chuck Martin (skier) (born 1967), American skier

See also
Charles Martin (disambiguation)